During the Second Italo-Ethiopian War, the Italians captured and either imprisoned as prisoners of war or executed selected prominent Ethiopians. The majority of the public executions and mass incarcerations happened in the wake of the assassination attempt on Rodolfo Graziani. The Italian occupying force gave permission to the black shirts to murder educated Ethiopians, sparing only a few notables who were transported to various concentration camps maintained in the Harar region, Italian Somaliland, Eritrea and Italy. While the majority of prisoners who were kept at Asinara and other camps in Italy survived, tens of thousands of detainees perished under the severe conditions they were forced to live in. According to famous survivors like Ambassador Imru Zeleke, conditions were worse in Italian Somaliland camps due to the scarcity of food, water and medicine. According to Imru Zeleke, tens of thousands of Ethiopians died every year. 

Princess Romanework Haile Selassie, Emperor Haile Selassie's daughter and the wife of Dejazmatch Beyene Merid, would later contract tuberculosis and was transferred to Ospedale Maggiore in Turin from Asinara, where she died on 14 October 1940. She was the only child of the Emperor who was captured. 
Woizero Denknesh Teklemariam and Lij Abate Mulat were among the young prisoners at Asinara. Lij Abate was captured with the renowned patriot Ras Desta Damtew. Woizero Denknesh was rounded up with her parents who were all imprisoned on the Italian island. While the fascist forces executed the Ras and select patriots, they shipped off other notable prisoners to Asinara and elsewhere.
In the picture seen below were a group of Ethiopian POWs held at one of the island prisons in Italy.

Asinara prison camp 
It is virtually impossible to find out the exact number of Ethiopian POWs who were imprisoned at different camps. The Asinara prison camp is an exception, due to its location in Europe and due to the personalities of the incarcerated individuals, the identities of many of the POWs and their approximate number became available through the years from people who kept records of their experiences in captivity.
According to the book "Etsub Dinq" written in Amharic by Balemberas Mahateme Selassie Wolde Meskel who was one of the prisoners at Asinara, the total number of prisoners was well over 400. He came up with names of close to 279 notables he remembered. Ras Imru Haile Selassie spent a few months at Asinara and later transferred to another detention camp where Ras Seyoum Mengesha was kept before the former's repatriation by the orders of Amedeo, 3rd Duke of Aosta, the Viceroy and Governor General of Italian East Africa. Ambassador Imru Zelleke was never incarcerated outside of East Africa. In the picture below, LtoR unidentified Ethiopian, Lij Seifu Mikael and Dejazmatch Girmachew TekleHawariat at Asinara Island.

List of Ethiopian POWs at Asinara 
The prisoners held on Asinara are as follows:

Princess Romanework Haile Selassie
Lij Merid Beyene 
Lij Samson Beyene 
Lij Getachew Beyene 
Lij Gideon Beyene 
Woizero AtsedeWoin Heruy
Woizero Genet Heruy
Dejazmatch Girmachew TekleHawariat
Lij Seifu Mikael
Woizero Sara Workneh
Woizero Ketsela Tullu
Kentiba Gebru Desta
Woizero Senedu Gebru
Emahoy YewubDar Gebru
Woizero Desta Gebru
Woizero Genet Gebru
Ato Wagaye Gebru
Ato Misew Gebru
Ato Bobi Gebru
Woizero ShewaReged Gedle
Ato Kifle Wodajo
Balambaras MahitemeSellasie WoldeMeskel
Lij Minase Asfaw
Dejazmatch Habte'Mikael Yinadu
TsehafeT'ezaz WoldeMeskel Tariku
Fitawrari LeulSeged Wendyirad
Lij Hiwot Wendyirad
Balambaras LeulSeged Yimer
NegaDires Gebre-Egziabher François
Woizero Aster Workneh
Kegnazmacth Habte'Mikael Birru
Ato Lema Shurte
Kegnazmatch Lema Bisewur
Girazmatch Legesse Gizaw
Kegnazmatch LeulSeged Deneke
Lij Liben Gebrehiwot
Ato LisaneWerk WeldeMikael
Weizero Hamere Eshete
Shiek Mohammed Shafi
Lij Mesay WendBewesen
Girazmatch Mesha Wenberu
Kegnazmatch Meshesha
Dejazmatch Metaferia MelkeTsedek
Dejazmatch Mengesha Wube
Ato Mekonnen Tesema
Ato Mekonnen WoldeYohannes
Dejazmatch Mekonnen Wosene
Ato Mekonnen WendAwik
Ato Mekonnen GebreHiwot
Lij Mulugeta Bezabih
Weizero Mamite
Ato Mamo BehsaWured
Ato Markos ManAmnoh
Ato Markos Reta
Ato Masresha
Weizero ManYahilishal Kassa
Weizero Mintiwab Tekle
Ato Minda HabteSellasie
Kegnazmatch Mola Wenberu
Ato SahileMariam Sifeta..
Fitawrari SahileGiorgis Nadew
Blatten Geta Sahle Tsedalu
Dejazmatch Seyoum Desta
Balambaras Reda
Woizero Roza
Ato SelaDingay Tilahun
Ato Senbeta Bedane
Woizero Sara GebreEyesus
Ato Samuel Gebreyes
Lij Sileshi Bezabih
Ato Sileshi WendBewesen
Sheik Shofe
Girazmatch Belew Tessema
Ato Belachew Yadete
Dejazmatch Belay Ali
Ato Berehe
Ato Bekele Senbete
Ato Bekele Kiros
Ato Bekele GebreTsadik
Woizero Bekelu Kassa
Girazmatch Bedasso Abdulahi
Ato BeFekadu WoldeMikael
Girazmatch Biyad'gilign
Ato Benedeto AtnafeAlem
Ato Birhane HabteMikael
Ato Birhane Markos
Lij BirhaneSellasie Yibsaa
Fitawrari Temesgen Bitew
Ato Temune
Lij Terefe WoldeGabriel
Blatta Tessema Belhu
Balambaras Tessema Ali
Blatta Tessema Debalke
Ato Tesfaye Tegegn
Dejazmatch Tesfa Tiku
Meli'ake Genet Tesfaye
Ato Teshome Minda
Girazmatch Tebeje
Ato TekleMariam Kassahun
Woizero Tewabech Ze'Amanuel
Girazmatch Tedla HaileGiorgis
Ato Tefera Lewetegn
Fitawrari Tefera Mesfin
Lij Teferi Bezabih
Ato Tefera'Werk Kidane'Weld
Lij Tadesse Wolde'Giorgis
Ato Tafesse Gessese
Ato Tewodros Workneh
Kegnazmatch HaileMikael Haji Bilto
Lij HaileMikael Zewde
Ato HaileMikael Fetene
Girazmatch HaileMariam Gessese
Dejazmatch HaileSellasie Aba Je'Bel
Azazh HaileSellasie Megenu
Kegnazmatch HaileTsion Kawotona
Ato Haili Markos
Dejazmatch Hailu Tesfaye
Ato Haile Bahir
Ato Haile Tessema
Balmbaras Haile GetaBicha
Lij Haile WoldeMeskel
Fitawari Haile WoldeTsadik
Kegnazmatch Haile Digua'Wuhaw
Ato Haile Digua'Wuhaw
Kegnazmatch Nigatu Beshe
Ato Alito
Kadi Ahmed
Kegnazmatch Amare GebreMariam
Ato Areke GebreHiwot
Woizero Aselefech
Woizero Asegedech
Ato Aseffa Mola
Ato Aseffa Solomon
Girazmatch Asres Tessema
Woizero Askale WoldeAmanuel
Woizero Askale Wosenne
Fitawrari Asfaw Man'Aye
Balambaras Asfaw TekleMariam
Girazmatch Asfaw Tamene
Ato Asfaw Andarge
Ato Asfaw Ali
Balambaras Asfaw WoldeGiorgis
Ato Asfaw GebreYohannes
Ato Asfaw FikreSellasie
Blatta Ashine KidaneMariam
Ato Abera Shih'New
Balambaras Abera Ketema
Woizero Abebech Abegaz
Woizero Abebech Cherkose
Girazmatch Abebe Nake
Dejazmatch Abebe Ayelewerk
Ato Abebe WoldeTsasdik
NegaDires Abebe Wolde
Bejirond Abegaz
Lij Abate Mulat
NegaDires Abayneh WoldeMikael
Ato Amberbir Abebe
Woizero Ayelech Birru
Ato Ayele Ali
Blatta Ayele Gebre
Dejazmatch Ayalew Birru
Fitawrari Ayalew Birru
Woizero AtnafeAlem GebreHiwot
AfeNigus AtnafSeged WoldeTsadik
Tsehafi Ti'ezaz AfeWerk
Ato Efrem Asfaw
Balambaras Emagnu Yimer
NegaDires Eshete Teketelew
Ato Eshete Hailu
NegaDires Eshete Wube
Aleka Estifanos
Kegnazmatch Kebede Meshesha
Dejazmatch Kebede Aragaw
Girazmatch Kebede Tasew
Kegnazmatch Keterew WoldeAregay
Blatta KidaneMariam Abera
Ato Kassa Maru
Dejazmatch Kassa Sibhat
Woizero Kassa Yelemitu
Girazmatch Kassa Raklis
Ato Kosros Bogosian
Woizero WoleteKidan Mamo
Yitot WoleteYes
Woizero Wolete Yohannes
Girazmatch WoldeMikael Desalegn
BlattenGeta WoldeMariam Ayele
Ato WoldeRufael Ashengo
Basha Wolde Sema'et
Ato WoldeSenbet Ayito
Kegnazmatch WoldeYes Ayele
Ato Wolde Gabriel
Fitawrari WoldeGiorgis Adem
Merigeta WoldeTsadik Aferu
Kegnazmatch WoldeTsadik Zegeye
Ato WoldeTsadik Zegeye
Ato Wolde Wossene
Lij Wossene Metaferia
Ato Workneh ZikArgachew
Ato Wondim Siamregn
NegaDires Wedajo Ali
Ato Amde Abera
Ato Umer Ibrahim
Ato Alemu Tekle
Basha Alemu
Ato Alemu Endashaw
Lij Aleme
Lij Zelleke Nigatu
Abba Zemede Birhan
Woizero Zenebech
Ato Zewde Tadesse
Zena AmdeMariam
Zimam Wodejao
Kegnazmatch YeshiNeh
Ato YetNeberk WoldeMeskel
Ato Yilma GebreKidan
Lij Yikum Abate
Ato Yibisa
Ato Yosef Ayele
Fitawrari Demise Habte-Selassie
Basha Demise Bedasa
Girazmatch Demise Abe
Ato Demise WoldeYes
Lij Dereje Mekonnen
Ato Desta Liben
Kentiba Desta Mitike
Fitawrari Desta AtnafSeged
Kegnazmatch Desta WeldeKiros
Woizero Desta WoldeMariam
Fitawrari Desalegn Cherinet
Ato Desalegn Abesha
Woizero Debritu Abnet
Kegnazmatch Dehne WoldeMariam
Balambaras Degefu Gebre
Woizero Dinknesh Teferi
Dinknesh BeshaWured
Woizero Dinknesh Dinkitu
Ato Dilnese
Ato Dua'ali Kadiye
Kadi Jami
Ato Gerime
Basha Gesesse Reda
Ras GebreHiwot Mikael
Ato GebreMikael Tesema
Blatta GebreMikael WoldeMeskel
Ato GebreMikael Selfako
Basha GebreMariam Surur
Ato GebreMariam Ewinetu
Ato GebreMariam Jimma
Abba Gebre-Selassie
Fitawrari Gebre-Selassie Aba Wurji
LiquLiqawunt Gebre-Ab
Lique Gebre-Kirstos Wolde-Yohannes
Ato GebreYes HabteGabriel
Ato GebreGiorgis GebreMariam
Ato GebreTsion Nigatu
Genet Tedla
Basha Gont Lante Yideru
Azazh Getahun Habte-Selassie
Ato GetaBicha Tsemiru
Fitawrari Gediwon Guangul
Balambaras Girma YayehYirad
Fitawrari Girma Mamo
Girazmatch Gibaw Gizaw
Girazmatch Gizaw Serawitu
Ligaba Tasew Walelu
Woizero Taitu Kebede
Afe Nigus Tilahun BeHabte
Azazh Tilaye Tesema
Ato Tilahun Cherinet
Ato Tigashaw Tsemiru
Woizero TiruWerk Aligaz
Tirunesh Wodere
Memhir Cherkos
Ato Tsegaye GebreTsadik
Kegnazmatch Tsige WerdeWerk
Kegnazmatch Tsige Yimamu
Woizero Tsehay Abeba AbaKoran
Kegnazmatch Tsemiru Gebre-Selassie
Fikade-Selassie Emagnu
Bejirond Fikre-Selassie Ketema

References

History of Ethiopia
Second Italo-Ethiopian War